Next Time the Fire is a 1993 Italian-French-Swiss drama film written and directed by Fabio Carpi.

The film was entered into the main competition at the 50th Venice International Film Festival.

Cast 
 
 Jean Rochefort as Amedeo 
 Marie-Christine Barrault as  Elena 
 Jacqueline Lustig as Gloria
 Lidija Kozlovic as  Diana 
 Lila Kedrova as The Mother

See also      
 List of Italian films of 1993

References

External links

1993 films
Italian drama films
Films directed by Fabio Carpi
1993 drama films
1990s Italian films